Paraná-Wolga-Deutsch is a High German variety spoken in Brazil and Argentina by persons of Volga German origin.

It is spoken in the Brazilian state of Paraná and the Argentine province of Entre Ríos.

References

German-Argentine culture
German-Brazilian culture
German dialects
High German languages
Volga German diaspora
Languages of Brazil
Languages of Argentina